Turneria rosschinga is a species of ant in the genus Turneria. Described by Shattuck in 2011, the species is endemic to Australia.

References

Dolichoderinae
Insects described in 2011
Hymenoptera of Australia